Fox Sunday Night is the former branding of the Sunday night primetime lineup on the Fox network, which featured a mix of animated and live-action series. It ran between stints of Animation Domination.

History

Sunday Funday (2014–17)
The Sunday Funday block was created to replace Fox's Animation Domination block, acknowledging that the Sunday primetime schedule was no longer fully made up of animated shows. The block's final show was American Dad!, of which was the final episode to air on Fox before moving to TBS on September 21, 2014. The initial lineup incorporated the remaining animated series from Animation Domination (including The Simpsons, Family Guy, and Bob's Burgers) with the addition of Brooklyn Nine-Nine, which previously aired on Tuesday nights, and the new sitcom, Mulaney. This marks the first time that Fox had regularly aired first-run live-action comedies on Sundays since 2005. Mulaney was cancelled in February 2015 and was replaced by mid-season replacement The Last Man on Earth.

On January 3, 2016, Brooklyn Nine-Nine was dropped from the Sunday Funday block and moved back to its original Tuesday night slot. The Last Man on Earth would then go on hiatus. In their place, new series Bordertown and Cooper Barrett's Guide to Surviving Life took their slots. Ultimately, both series were cancelled after one season.

On September 25, 2016, Son of Zorn premiered at 8:30pm. The series would be replaced by Making History on March 5, 2017. Both series would also be cancelled after one season.

As "Fox Sunday Night" (2017–19)
Beginning with the 2017/18 season, the Sunday Funday block was dropped. Hereafter, the Sunday night lineup was simply referred to as "Fox Sunday". Ghosted premiered on October 1, 2017, but was cancelled after one season. On May 10, 2018, The Last Man on Earth was cancelled. The following day, Brooklyn Nine-Nine was picked up by NBC.

For the 2018/19 season, Rel premiered as a sneak preview on September 9, 2018. The series would also be cancelled after one season. A new season of Cosmos was set to premiere in the Spring, but was pulled. Reruns of Last Man Standing, began airing in the 7PM hour.

Ahead of the 2019/20 season, Fox began promoting the return of the Animation Domination block, with new show Bless the Harts debuting that Fall.

Shows

Schedules
All times are in (ET/PT).

2014/15

2015/16

2016/17

2017/18

2018/19

See also
 List of programs broadcast by Fox
 Animation on Fox
 Animation Domination

References

2014 introductions
Fox Broadcasting Company
Television programming blocks in the United States